Mayne's sign is a clinical sign that indicates that there is a drop of at least  in the diastolic blood pressure on raising the arm. It occurs in patients with aortic regurgitation though shouldn't be considered a reliable finding.

References 

Symptoms and signs: Cardiac